The Embassy of Sweden in Algiers is Sweden's diplomatic mission in Algeria. The first Swedish ambassador was accredited to Algiers in 1963. The ambassador since 2021 is Björn Häggmark.

History
Sweden has had relations with Algeria since 1727 and the first Swedish consulate was established in 1729. The first bilateral agreement between Sweden and Algeria was signed in 1729. The Swedish embassy in Algiers opened after Algeria's independence in 1962. The embassy was subordinate to the consulate until 1968. From 1968 to 1980, the Swedish ambassador was also accredited to Bamako, Mali. Since 2012, Sweden and Poland have shared embassies. The Polish embassy in Algiers represents Sweden for the application for a Schengen visa. The Swedish embassy has no visa operations.

Buildings

Chancery
In 1964, the chancery was located at the address 4 Boulevard Mohammed V, Algiers. The current chancery is located in the district of Hydra, 5 kilometers south of the capital Algiers city centre. The embassy plot and the neighboring plot, where the ambassadorial residence is located, were acquired by the Swedish state in 1958. However, the sketch work for the embassy office did not begin until 1983. The embassy office was designed by Bo Myrenberg, Myrenbergs Arkitektkontor and was built by Skanska. The years 1985–1988 (during which time the current office was built) the address was B.P. 23, Place Allende, 16300 Bir Mourad Raïs, Algiers. Since 1989 the address is B.P. 263, DZ-16035 Hydra/Alger.

The plot is located in hilly terrain with large level differences. This has affected the layout of the office building, which has offices on two floors. The entrance faces the street while the staff housing is on the third floor. On the ground floor is the main entrance with waiting room and reception. The offices are mainly located on the second floor with a dozen service rooms, a meeting room and a lunch room. The building is cast in solid concrete. The floors are covered with cement mosaic, while doors and cabinet interiors are made of Swedish beech, which gives the interior a blond Nordic touch. The garden's plants are specially selected to provide a rich spectrum of greenery and for them to bloom in all seasons.

Over the years, the needs of the operations have changed and for the current operations, the Ministry of Foreign Affairs' space requirements have been halved. The former ambassador Eva Emneus was instrumental in establishing contact with the Polish delegation locally, which led to a rebuild being carried out in 2011, so that the Polish embassy could move in and divide the premises. Program document was prepared by GRAD architects. BAU architects designed the construction document as general consultant together with Tyréns, POAB, Electro Engineering and Brandkonsulten. The contract was carried out by Bygg & Marinteknik. The conversion involved a joint reception, where Sweden and Poland coexist behind the same counter. The embassies of the two countries also have a common entrance, kitchen and dining room, conference rooms, parking spaces and parts of the garden around the office. With the words "We are proud of our long cooperation with Algeria and sharing our embassy with Poland", State Secretary for Foreign Affairs Frank Belfrage inaugurated the joint embassy in Algiers on 27 March 2012.

Residence
In 1964, the residence was located at the address Villa Les Erbrives, Rue No 5, Parc le Paradou, Hydra-Algiers. In 1965, the residence was located at the address Villa Trois Couronnes, Rue No 5, Parc le Paradou, Hydra-Algiers.

The plot where the residence is located today and the neighboring plot where the embassy building is located were acquired by the Swedish state in 1958. The ambassadorial residence was built in the late 1950s and was completed in 1960. It is a modern French-style villa that feels Nordic and decorated with furniture by Josef Frank. The residence was designed by Henry Guibout.

Heads of Mission

References

External links
 
 

Algiers
Algeria–Sweden relations
Sweden